Joan E. Strassmann is a North American evolutionary biologist and the Charles Rebstock Professor of Biology at the Washington University in St. Louis. She is known for her work on social evolution and particularly how cooperation prospers in the face of evolutionary conflicts.

Her dissertation research explored theories of social behavior and evolution using individually marked social wasps in wild colonies. In 2011, Strassmann joined the Biology Department of Washington University in St. Louis. after leaving Rice University where she worked for the previous 31 years. Strassman earned a bachelor's degree in zoology from the University of Michigan and a Ph.D. in zoology from the University of Texas.

She is a member of the National Academy of Sciences (2013). She has received a John Simon Guggenheim Memorial Fellowship (2004), was elected a Fellow of the Animal Behavior Society (2002), the American Association for the Advancement of Science (2004), and the American Academy of Arts and Sciences (2008), and served as president of the Animal Behavior Society (2012).

Dr. Strassmann has a blog where she shares her beliefs on teaching, learning, and science. She believes that Wikipedia is a good resource for learning and teaching. Dr. Strassmann has also addressed the need for diversity among academicians.

Honors 
Fellow, Animal Behavior Society, 2002
Fellow, American Association for the Advancement of Science, 2004
Fellow, American Academy of Arts and Sciences, 2008
Member, National Academy of Sciences, 2013

References

External links
 

Strassman's profile on Washington University in St. Louis

Evolutionary biologists
Women evolutionary biologists
University of Michigan College of Literature, Science, and the Arts alumni
University of Texas at Austin alumni
Rice University faculty
Living people
Year of birth missing (living people)